Tadeusz Klimecki (November 23, 1895July 4, 1943) – Brigadier General of the Polish Army, Chief of Polish General Staff.

Early life and service in the Imperial and Royal Army
Tadeusz Klimecki was born in Tarnów, Galicia,  Austro-Hungarian Empire. His father was a local lawyer, Joseph Klimecki, and his mother was Ludwika Regiec.

In 1913 he graduated from the gymnasium in Jasło and enrolled at the Faculty of Law of the Jagiellonian University.

In 1914 he joined the Eastern Legion, and at its dissolution he was drafted into the Austrian army. After graduating from the school of infantry officers he was sent to the Italian front as a platoon leader. In 1915 he was appointed a standard-bearer, in 1916  – a second lieutenant. By the  end of World War I he had been wounded three times and served as a company commander.

Service in the Polish Army

From November 1918 served in the Polish Army. Between November 1918 and October 1925 he was a company and battalion commander in the 16th Infantry Regiment, Tarnów and during the war with the Bolsheviks, he commanded the regiment (31.VII-4.VIII.1920). From October 1925 to October 1927 he was student of the Highest Military School in Warsaw, after which he was Chief of Staff of the 12th Infantry Division in Tarnopol until 1930. During the years 1930–1934 he was professor of tactics at the Higher Military School in Warsaw.

Between January 1934 – 1936 – Deputy Commander of the 18 Infantry Regiment in Skierniewice.

1936–1938 – Commander of the 5th Podhale Rifles Regiment in Przemyśl.

From 1938 to September 1939 he was Head of the course at the Higher Military School in Warsaw, after which he was appointed to the Division III of the General Staff as a Chief of the Department of Operations. After the September campaign he moved to France.

December 1939 – June 1940 Head of Division III, Polish General Staff in France.
 
July 1940 – July 1943 Chief of the General Staff of the Supreme Commander in London.

He died in the plane crash on July 4, 1943, in Gibraltar, together with the Polish Prime-Minister and Commander-in-Chief General Władysław Sikorski and his staff. Tadeusz Klimecki was buried in the cemetery of Polish airmen in Newark-on-Trent, England.

On December 9, 2010,  Tadeusz Klimecki  and Andrzej Marecki were buried in the Powązki Military Cemetery in Warsaw.

Promotions 
 Captain – since June 1, 1919
 Major – since July 1, 1925
 Lieutenant Colonel – since January 1, 1931
 Colonel – since March 19, 1938
 Brigadier – since February 6, 1941

Orders and decorations 
 Silver Cross of the Order of Virtuti Militari
 Commander's Cross with Star of the Order of Polonia Restituta
 Cross of Valour
 Grand Officer of the Order of the White Lion, 1941

References 

 T. Kryska Karski S. Żurakowski, Generałowie Polski Niepodległej, Editions Spotkania, Warszawa 1991.
 H. P Kosk, Generalicja polska, t. 1, Oficyna Wydawnicza "Ajaks", Pruszków 1998.

External links 
 "Tadeusz Klimecki" by Przemysław Jaskółowski
  Family photos of general Klimecki, by Przemysław Jaskółowski
 Tadeusz Klimecki (Polish Wikipedia)
 General Staff of the Polish Armed Forces
 Chiefs of Polish General Staff
 David Irving "Accident — The Death of General Sikorski"
 Newark-on-Trent Cemetery
General Sikorski Mystery – Polish Officers to be Exhumed at Newark
Polish Radio: Funeral of two Sikorski's officers 

1895 births
1943 deaths
People from Tarnów
Polish Austro-Hungarians
Polish generals
Chiefs of staff
Recipients of the Silver Cross of the Virtuti Militari
Commanders with Star of the Order of Polonia Restituta
Recipients of the Cross of Valour (Poland)
Austro-Hungarian military personnel of World War I
Polish military personnel of World War II
Burials at Powązki Military Cemetery
Victims of aviation accidents or incidents in Gibraltar
Victims of aviation accidents or incidents in 1943